Fred C. Wilson (August 2, 1928 – 2007) was an American racecar driver from Denver, Colorado.

Trivia
He won a race on three wheels, only to be disqualified.
He led the 1st laps of the 1st Daytona 500, only to have engine failure in the beginning of the race.

References

1928 births
2007 deaths
Racing drivers from Colorado
Racing drivers from Denver